The  ("Route of Lights") is a festival held every autumn in Eindhoven, in the southern Netherlands.  It starts with a parade on 18 September, celebrating the liberation of Eindhoven during World War II on that date in 1944.  The Lichtjesroute is celebrated not only to commemorate the liberation, but also to create an illusion of "fairytales in light".

Origin
Committee members included the Municipal Energy company , Philips, the Federation of Neighbourhood Associations, the Eindhoven Installer Association, and the tourist board Association for Foreign Traffic. The committee had the idea to give the celebrations some extra light. The inhabitants of Eindhoven were asked to help by making their houses shine in any way possible for one day. Because many things were still in short supply so soon after the war, this was mostly restricted to candles at the windows.

After 1947, the Foundation for Liberation Commemoration took over coordination of all festival activities. The original day of lights was transformed into a "route of lights".  In several places throughout the city, dubbed Focal Points or Fire Points, celebration lighting illuminated the area for four days, between 20:00 and 24:00 each day.

In the following years, the number of Fire Points grew steadily. This would be the last year the Lichtjesroute was celebrated for more than a decade.

In 1984, a number of enthusiasts decided it was time to give the Lichtjesroute a new life.  Through a mailing, a thousand corporations were asked for financial support, and the local media called for volunteers to help make the new Lichtjesroute a reality.

The route today

The Lichtjesroute, as revived in 1984, consists of a route through the centre of Eindhoven and through the suburbs of Stratum, Strijp, and Woensel. Families usually travel the route by car; officials have also made it friendly for cyclists who want to follow the route. The route is indicated by reflecting "pointer" signs that show an arrow and a red picture of a light bulb. On some signs, the text  (cycle route) is also added, to indicate areas where cyclists should follow an alternate route.

Along the route, various frames with ornaments made from lights are mounted onto lamp posts.  The ornaments depict various objects and animals; some have World War II–themed imagery.  Ornaments are usually grouped by common themes—all animals are located together, for example.  The placement of the ornaments changes each year, but in some places, the same ornaments are shown each year.  For example,  ("Half-moon Street") is always decorated with half-moon crescent shapes.  The  area always has ornaments of astrological signs, because the streets there are named after characters from Greek and Roman mythology.  In  ("White Village"), there are no ornaments—but red, white, and blue lamps, symbolic of the flag of the Netherlands, are placed on the bay windows, where they shine onto the white houses.

These points are usually the busiest on the route, and as a result, traffic jams are common there.

Sustainability
In 2006, the Foundation started replacing the incandescent light bulbs with light-emitting diodes (LEDs); an initial batch of one thousand LED bulbs was installed.  Over time, the incandescent lights will be retired; wholesale replacement of the existing bulbs would be too expensive. Compact fluorescent lamps, used to save energy in other applications, are not a viable solution because they are not suitable for outside lighting.

References

External links 
 De Lichtjesroute

Culture in Eindhoven
Festivals in the Netherlands
Tourist attractions in North Brabant
Autumn events in the Netherlands